Qualification for the 2016 Little League World Series took place in eight United States regions and eight international regions from June through August 2016.

United States

Great Lakes
The tournament began August 7 in Indianapolis, Indiana. Due to inclement weather during the championship game on August 13 and an unfavorable forecast in the following the days, the championship game, in which play was suspended in the top of the second inning, was completed at Howard J. Lamade Stadium in South Williamsport, Pennsylvania on August 15.

Mid-Atlantic
The tournament took place in Bristol, Connecticut from August 7–13.

Midwest
The tournament took place in Indianapolis, Indiana from August 7–13.

Note: North Dakota and South Dakota are organized into a single Little League district.

New England
The tournament took place in Bristol, Connecticut from August 7–13.

Northwest
The tournament took place in San Bernardino, California from August 7–13.

Southeast
The tournament took place in Warner Robins, Georgia from August 5–10.

Southwest
The tournament took place in Waco, Texas from August 4–10.

West
The tournament took place in San Bernardino, California from August 7–13.

International

Asia-Pacific and Middle East
The tournament took place in Seoul, South Korea from June 25–July 1.

1 Republic of China, commonly known as Taiwan, due to complicated relations with People's Republic of China, is recognized by the name Chinese Taipei by majority of international organizations including Little League Baseball (LLB). For more information, please see Cross-Strait relations.

Australia
The tournament took place in Lismore, New South Wales from June 8–13. The top two teams in each pool advance to the elimination round, where they are seeded one through eight based on overall record.

Canada
The tournament took place in Vancouver, British Columbia from August 4–13. The following teams have qualified to compete in the tournament.

Caribbean
The tournament took place in Saint Croix, U.S. Virgin Islands from July 16–23.

Europe and Africa
The tournament took place in Kutno, Poland from July 15–23. The format of the tournament was a modified double elimination.

Japan
The tournament took place in Ueda, Nagano from July 30–31.

Latin America
The tournament took place in Guatemala City, Guatemala from July 23–30.

Mexico
The tournament took place in Monterrey, Nuevo León from July 9–15.

References

2016 Little League World Series
2016 in baseball